Bernard Thompson (born August 30, 1962) is an American retired professional basketball player. At a height of 6'7" (2.007 m), he played as a small forward-shooting guard, from Phoenix, Arizona. Thompson played five seasons in the National Basketball Association (NBA), from 1984 to 1989.

College career
After attending South Mountain High School, in Phoenix, Arizona, Thompson played college basketball at Fresno State, from 1980 to 1984.

Professional career
Thompson who was selected by the Portland Trail Blazers, in the first round (19th pick overall) of the 1984 NBA draft. Thompson played for the Blazers, Phoenix Suns and Houston Rockets. Thompson's best year as a pro came during the 1985–86 season, as a member of the Suns, as he appeared in 61 games and averaged 8.5 points per game.

After the close of his NBA career, Thompson played four seasons in the Continental Basketball Association (CBA), with the Columbus Horizon, Grand Rapids Hoops, Rockford Lightning, Oklahoma City Cavalry and Fargo-Moorhead Fever.  He averaged 18.4 points and 4.7 rebounds per game during his CBA career.

Coaching career
Thompson was the assistant coach of the Arizona Rhinos, of the ABA, for 2 years.

References

External links
Bernard Thompson NBA stats @ basketballreference.com

1962 births
Living people
African-American basketball players
American expatriate basketball people in Chile
American expatriate basketball people in Germany
American expatriate basketball people in Israel
American expatriate basketball people in Japan
American expatriate basketball people in the Philippines
American men's basketball players
Basketball coaches from Arizona
Basketball players from Phoenix, Arizona
Charlotte Hornets expansion draft picks
Columbus Horizon players
Fargo-Moorhead Fever players
Fresno State Bulldogs men's basketball players
Grand Rapids Hoops players
Houston Rockets players
Maccabi Haifa B.C. players
Oklahoma City Cavalry players
Philippine Basketball Association imports
Phoenix Suns players
Pop Cola Panthers players
Portland Trail Blazers draft picks
Portland Trail Blazers players
Rockford Lightning players
Shooting guards
Small forwards
Sportspeople from Phoenix, Arizona
Sta. Lucia Realtors players
UC Santa Cruz Banana Slugs men's basketball coaches
20th-century African-American sportspeople
21st-century African-American sportspeople